State Route 108 (SR-108) is a state highway in the U.S. state of Utah that spans  in Davis and Weber Counties. The road connects I-15 and Layton to Syracuse and Clinton before terminating at SR-126 in Roy. The entire route is within the Ogden-Clearfield metropolitan area.

Route description

The route starts out in the city of Layton in Davis County, just east of I-15, initially going west along Antelope Drive, named for Antelope Island, which is accessed via this road. After traveling west for four miles (6 km), the route turns north onto 2000 West, while SR-127 continues west to the island. During its northern stretch, the route passes through the cities of Syracuse and Clinton, before entering Weber County and the city of Roy. In Roy, the route continues north until just after 4800 South, turning to the northeast along Midland Drive. It generally continues in this direction until the northern terminus at SR-126.

History
The state legislature created SR-108 in 1931, running west from SR-1 (now SR-126) to Syracuse. A 1941 law extended it east from SR-1 to SR-232 in Layton and north from Syracuse to SR-37. As part of a 1969 truncation of SR-37, SR-108 was extended northeast over part of that route to SR-84 (now SR-126). The final change was made in 1996, when the piece between SR-232 and I-15 was given to the city of Layton for widening.

Major intersections

See also

 List of state highways in Utah

References

External links

108
 108
 108